Saltwater Creek is a creek in Rothwell, Moreton Bay Region, Queensland, Australia.

Geography 
It flows north from Hays Inlet and separates Mango Hill from Rothwell, creating a border for Redcliffe City. Its name derives from the water being, in fact, salt water.

See also 

List of rivers of Australia

References 

Rivers of Queensland
Geography of South East Queensland